2I/Borisov, originally designated C/2019 Q4 (Borisov), is the first observed rogue comet and the second observed interstellar interloper after ʻOumuamua. It was discovered by the Crimean amateur astronomer and telescope maker Gennadiy Borisov on 29 August 2019 UTC (30 August local time).

2I/Borisov has a heliocentric orbital eccentricity of 3.36 and is not bound to the Sun. The comet passed closest to Earth on 28 December 2019. In November 2019, astronomers from Yale University said that the comet's tail was 14 times the size of Earth, and stated, "It's humbling to realize how small Earth is next to this visitor from another solar system." In the middle of March, 2020, the comet was observed to fragment; and later, in April, even more evidence of fragmentation was reported.

Nomenclature 

The comet is formally called "2I/Borisov" by the International Astronomical Union (IAU), with "2I" or "2I/2019 Q4" being its designation and "Borisov" being its name, but is sometimes referred to as "Comet Borisov", especially in the popular press. As the second observed interstellar interloper after 1I/ʻOumuamua, it was given the "2I" designation, where "I" stands for interstellar. The name Borisov follows the tradition of naming comets after their discoverers. Before final designation as 2I/Borisov, the object was referred to by other names:
 Early orbit solutions suggested that the comet could be a near-Earth object and was thus listed on IAU's Minor Planet Center's (MPC) Near-Earth Object Confirmation Page (NEOCP) as gb00234.
 Further refinements after thirteen days of observation made clear the object was a hyperbolic comet, and it was given the designation C/2019 Q4 (Borisov) by the Minor Planet Center on 11 September 2019. A number of other astronomers including Davide Farnocchia, Bill Gray, and David Tholen concluded that the comet was interstellar. 
 On 24 September 2019 the IAU announced that the Working Group for Small Body Nomenclature kept the name Borisov giving the comet the interstellar designation of 2I/Borisov, formally announcing the comet was indeed interstellar.

Characteristics 

Unlike ʻOumuamua, which had an asteroidal appearance, 2I/Borisov's nucleus is surrounded by a coma, a cloud of dust and gas.

Size and shape 

Also, the amplitude of non-gravitational acceleration place an upper limit of 0.4 km on nucleus size, consistent with a previous Hubble Space Telescope upper limit of 0.5 km. The comet did not come much closer to Earth than 300 million km, which prevents using radar to directly determine its size and shape. This could be done using the occultation of a star by 2I/Borisov but an occultation would be difficult to predict, requiring a precise determination of its orbit, and the detection would necessitate a network of small telescopes.

Rotation 

A study using observations from Hubble could not find a variation in the light curve. According to this study the rotational period must be larger than 10 hours. A study with CSA's NEOSSat found a period of 13.2 ± 0.2 day, which is unlikely to be the nuclear spin. Monte Carlo simulations based on the available orbit determinations suggest that the equatorial obliquity of 2I/Borisov could be about 59 degrees or 90 degrees, the latter is favored for the latest orbit determination.

Chemical makeup and nucleus structure 

Dave Jewitt and Jane Luu estimate from the size of its coma the comet is producing 2 kg/s of dust and is losing 60 kg/s of water. They extrapolate that it became active in June 2019 when it was between 4 and 5  from the Sun. A search of image archives found precovery observations of 2I/Borisov as early as 13 December 2018, but not on 21 November 2018, indicating it became active between these dates.

2I/Borisov's composition appears uncommon yet not unseen in Solar System comets, being relatively depleted in water and diatomic carbon (C2), but enriched in carbon monoxide and amines (R-NH2). The molar ratio of carbon monoxide to water in 2I/Borisov tail is 35–105%, resembling the unusual blue-tailed comet C/2016 R2 (PANSTARRS) in contrast to the average ratio of 4% for solar system comets.

The 2I/Borisov has also produced a minor amount of neutral nickel emission attributed to an unknown volatile compound of nickel. The nickel to iron abundance ratio is similar to Solar System comets.

Trajectory 

As seen from Earth, the comet was in the northern sky from September until mid-November. It crossed the ecliptic plane on 26 October near the star Regulus, and the celestial equator on 13 November 2019, entering the southern sky. On 8 December 2019, the comet reached perihelion (closest approach to the Sun) and was near the inner edge of the asteroid belt. In late December, it made its closest approach to Earth, 1.9 , and had a solar elongation of about 80°. Due to its 44° orbital inclination, 2I/Borisov did not make any notable close approaches to the planets. 2I/Borisov entered the Solar System from the direction of Cassiopeia near the border with Perseus. This direction indicates that it originates from the galactic plane, rather than from the galactic halo. It will leave the Solar System in the direction of Telescopium. In interstellar space, 2I/Borisov takes roughly  years to travel a light-year relative to the Sun.

2I/Borisov's trajectory is extremely hyperbolic, having an orbital eccentricity of 3.36. These two parameters are important indicators of 2I/Borisov's interstellar origin. At this larger distance, the Sun's gravity is less able to alter its path as it passes through the Solar System.

Observation

Discovery 

The comet was discovered on 30 August 2019 by amateur astronomer Gennadiy Borisov at his personal observatory MARGO in Nauchnyy, Crimea, using a 0.65 meter telescope he designed and built himself. The discovery has been compared to the discovery of Pluto by Clyde Tombaugh. Tombaugh was also an amateur astronomer who was building his own telescopes, although he discovered Pluto using Lowell Observatory's astrograph. At discovery, it was inbound  from the Sun,  from Earth, and had a solar elongation of 38°. Borisov described his discovery thus:

2I/Borisov's interstellar origin required a couple of weeks to confirm. Early orbital solutions based on initial observations included the possibility that the comet could be a near-Earth object 1.4  from the Sun in an elliptical orbit with an orbital period of less than 1 year. Later using 151 observations over 12 days, NASA Jet Propulsion Laboratory's Scout gave an eccentricity range of 2.9–4.5 . But with an observation arc of only 12 days, there was still some doubt that it was interstellar because the observations were at a low solar elongation, which could introduce biases in the data such as differential refraction. However, based on available observations, the orbit could only be parabolic if non-gravitational forces (thrust due to outgassing) affected its orbit more than any previous comets. Eventually with more observations the orbit converged to the hyperbolic solution that indicated an interstellar origin and non-gravitational forces could not explain the motion.

Observation 

The last observations were in July 2020, seven months after perihelion. Observation of 2I/Borisov was aided by the fact that the comet was detected while inbound towards the Solar System. ʻOumuamua had been discovered as it was leaving the system, and thus could only be observed for 80 days before it was out of range. Because of its closest approach occurring near traditional year-end holidays, and the capability to have extended observations, some astronomers have called 2I/Borisov a "Christmas comet". Observations using the Hubble Space Telescope began on 12 October, when the comet moved far enough from the Sun to be safely observed by the telescope. Hubble is less affected by the confounding effects of the coma than ground-based telescopes, which will allow it to study the rotational light curve of 2I/Borisov's nucleus. This should facilitate an estimate of its size and shape.

Comet chemistry 

A preliminary (low-resolution) visible spectrum of 2I/Borisov was similar to typical Oort Cloud comets. Its color indexes also resemble the Solar System's long period comets. Emissions at  indicated the presence of cyanide (formula CN), which is typically the first detected in Solar System comets including comet Halley. This was the first detection of gas emissions from an interstellar object. The non-detection of diatomic carbon had also been reported in October 2019, with the ratio C2 to CN being less than either 0.095 or 0.3 . The diatomic carbon was positively detected in November 2019, with measured C2 to CN ratio of  . This resembles a carbon-chain depleted group of comets, which are either Jupiter family comets or rare blue-colored carbon monoxide comets exemplified by C/2016 R2. By the end of November 2019, C2 production have dramatically increased, and C2 to CN ratio have reached 0.61, along with appearance of bright amine (NH2) bands. Atomic oxygen has also been detected, from this observers estimated an outgassing of water at a rate similar to Solar System comets. Initially, neither water nor OH lines were directly detected in September 2019. First unambiguous detection of OH lines was done 1 November 2019, and OH production peaked in early December 2019.

Suspected nucleus fragmentation 

The comet did come within about 2  of the Sun, a distance at which many small comets have been found to disintegrate. The probability that a comet disintegrates strongly depends on the size of its nucleus; Guzik et al. estimated a probability of 10% that this will happen to 2I/Borisov. Jewitt and Luu compared 2I/Borisov to C/2019 J2 (Palomar), another comet of similar size that disintegrated in May 2019 at a distance of 1.9  from the Sun. In the event that the nucleus disintegrates, as is sometimes seen with small comets, Hubble can be used to study the evolution of the disintegration process.

The severe outburst in February-March 2020, led to suspected "ongoing nucleus fragmentation" from the comet by March 12.
Indeed, images from the Hubble Space Telescope taken on 30 March 2020 show a non-stellar core indicating that Comet 2I/Borisov has ejected sunward a large fragment. The ejection is estimated to have begun around 7 March, and may have occurred during one of the outbursts that occurred near that time. The ejected fragment appeared to have vanished by 6 April 2020.

A followup study, reported on 6 April 2020, observed only a single object, and noted that the fragment component had now disappeared. Later analysis of the event showed the ejected dust and fragments have a combined mass of about 0.1% of total mass of nucleus, making the event a large outburst rather than fragmentation.

Exploration 

The high hyperbolic excess velocity of 2I/Borisov of  makes it hard for a spacecraft to reach the comet with existing technology: According to a team of the Initiative for Interstellar Studies, a 202 kg (445 lb) spacecraft could theoretically have been sent in July 2018 to intercept 2I/Borisov using a Falcon Heavy-class launcher, or 765 kg (1687 lb) on a Space Launch System (SLS)-class booster, but only if the object had been discovered much earlier than it was to meet the optimal launch date. Launches after the actual discovery date would eliminate the possibility to use Falcon Heavy-class rockets, requiring Oberth maneuvres near Jupiter and near the Sun and a larger launch vehicle. According to congressional testimony, NASA may need at least five years of preparation to launch such an intercepting mission.

See also 
 ʻOumuamua - the first interstellar interloper discovered
 Blue (carbon monoxide rich) comets
 Comet Morehouse
 Comet Humason
 C/2016 R2
 C/1980 E1 (Bowell) – the most eccentric comet known in the Solar System with an eccentricity of 1.057
 List of Solar System objects by greatest aphelion

Notes

References

External links 

 
 Image of 2I/Borisov – comet is "14 times the size of Earth" (Yale University; November 2019)
 Image of 2I/Borisov from the Gemini Observatory, Hawaii
 Pictures of 2I/Borisov from Paris Observatory (LESIA)
 Discovery animation
 FAQ at ProjectPluto (Bill Gray)
 Extrasolar Planetary Encyclopedia – 2I/Borisov
 Hyperbolic orbit simulation – 2I/Borisov (Tony Dunn)
 Minor Planet Center MPEC 2019-T116 : COMET 2I/Borisov
 Magnitude plot by Seiichi Yoshida @ aerith.net (with predicted brightness)
  (MBusch/SShostak) – SETI (19 September 2019)
  – NASA (20 April 2020)
 
 Interactive 3D gravity simulation of Borisov's Solar System flyby

20190830
Comets in 2019
Discoveries by amateur astronomers
Discoveries by the Crimean Astrophysical Observatory
Hyperbolic comets
Interstellar objects
Milky Way